5th Regiment of Horse or 5th Horse may refer to:

 Princess Anne of Denmark's Regiment of Horse, ranked as 5th Horse from 1685 to 1690
 4th Royal Irish Dragoon Guards, ranked as 5th Horse from 1690 to 1746
 5th Horse, cavalry regiment of the Pakistan Army